Oakley Block Dam is a proposed reservoir on the Mzingwane River, south of West Nicholson, Zimbabwe with a capacity of 41 million cubic metres.

References

Dams on the Mzingwane River
Proposed infrastructure in Zimbabwe
Proposed dams